Jaroslav Knotek (29 June 1912 – 18 March 1996) was a Czech athlete. He competed in the men's hammer throw at the 1936 Summer Olympics and the 1948 Summer Olympics.

References

External links
 

1912 births
1996 deaths
Athletes (track and field) at the 1936 Summer Olympics
Athletes (track and field) at the 1948 Summer Olympics
Czech male hammer throwers
Olympic athletes of Czechoslovakia
People from Klatovy District
Sportspeople from the Plzeň Region